The Devout Communicant may refer to:

 The Devout Communicant, an 18th-century Franciscan book by Pacificus Baker
 "The Devout Communicant", a 19th-century Anglican hymn by Gerard Moultrie